Once Twice Melody is the eighth studio album by the American dream pop duo Beach House, released on February 18, 2022. It is a double album of 18 songs, presented in four chapters.

Release
The first chapter was released on November 10, 2021, the second on December 8, 2021, and the third on January 19, 2022. "Hurts to Love" was released as a standalone single on February 14, 2022, to coincide with Valentine's Day. Once Twice Melody was released in full, by Sub Pop, on February 18, 2022.

Critical reception

Once Twice Melody was released to universal acclaim from contemporary music critics. At Metacritic, which assigns a normalized rating out of 100 to reviews from mainstream critics, the album received an average score of 84, based on 22 reviews, which indicates "universal acclaim". Aggregator AnyDecentMusic? gave it 7.8 out of 10, based on their assessment of the critical consensus.

Reviewing the album for AllMusic, Heather Phares claimed that, "Though Once Twice Melody is unapologetically lush even by Beach House's standards, the duo uses space creatively to express the beauty in sadness." Stevie Chick of Mojo called it the band's "grandest vision yet", praising the "impassive beauty" of Legrand's vocals and comparing them to "'O Superman'-era Laurie Anderson serenades, or as if someone programmed AI to sing like Judee Sill." Jason Anderson of Uncut commended the "stunning" cinematic quality of the first chapter and praised the album's "unexpected elements" for deftly counterbalancing the "grandeur and glamour from becoming sickly sweet." Uncut concluded that the album's "greatness lies not in its hugeness - it's in the duo's ability to create music that possesses the same intimacy regardless of its scope."

Track listing

Personnel
 Beach House – arrangement, performance; production, engineering; art direction
 Victoria Legrand
 Alex Scally
 James Barone
 James Barone – live drums (writing, performance)
 Michael Scally – guitar solo (3)
 Wheatie Mattiasich – additional vocals (9)
 Rebecca Morrin – additional vocals (9)
 David Campbell – live strings arrangement
 Nick Tveitbakk – live drums engineering (1, 2, 4, 5, 8, 10, 12–14, 18)
 Trevor Spencer – live drums engineering (2–4, 6–9, 11), mixing (5, 11)
 Gabe Burch – live strings engineering
 Travis Warner – live strings engineering
 Johnny Morgan – assistant live drums engineering (2–4, 6–9, 11)
 Alan Moulder – mixing (1–4, 6–8, 10, 12, 16, 18)
 Caesar Edmunds – mixing (9, 13, 15, 17)
 Dave Fridmann – mixing (14)
 Mike Fridmann – assistant mixing (14)
 Greg Calbi – mastering
 Steve Fallone – mastering
 Jeff Kleinsmith – art direction, design
 Nicholas Law – inside heart art

Charts

References

2022 albums
Beach House albums
Sub Pop albums